Magic is an album recorded by the Four Tops, released in 1985 on Motown Records.
The album reached No. 23 on the Blues & Soul Top British Soul Albums chart and No. 33 on the Billboard Top US R&B Albums chart.

Overview
Half of the Magic album was produced by Reggie Lucas, which was the idea of Iris Gordy, who felt his work on the debut double-platinum Madonna album reminded her of an updated Holland-Dozier-Holland sound. The other half was handled by Willie Hutch.

Reggie Lucas produced the song "Maybe Tomorrow", a duet between Levi Stubbs and Phyllis Hyman, which received substantial urban contemporary airplay.

Singles
"Sexy Ways" peaked at No. 21 on the US Billboard Hot R&B Singles chart.

Track listing

Personnel 
 Levi Stubbs - lead vocals
 Abdul "Duke" Fakir, Renaldo "Obie" Benson, Lawrence Payton, The Andantes - backing vocals
 Reggie Lucas - producer (track 8)

References

1985 albums
Four Tops albums
Motown albums